Palaquium microphyllum is a tree in the family Sapotaceae. The specific epithet microphyllum means "small leaves".

Description
The bark is reddish brown. Inflorescences bear up to four flowers.

Distribution and habitat
Palaquium microphyllum is native to Sumatra, Peninsular Malaysia, Singapore and Borneo. Its habitat is swamps, mixed dipterocarp and kerangas forests.

Conservation
Palaquium microphyllum has been assessed as near threatened on the IUCN Red List. The species is threatened by logging and conversion of land for palm oil plantations.

References

microphyllum
Trees of Sumatra
Trees of Malaya
Trees of Borneo
Plants described in 1906